Mehmet Tillem (10 September 1974 – 9 November 2019) was an Australian politician who served as Senator for Victoria. He was an Australian Labor Party member of the Australian Senate from 21 August 2013 to 30 June 2014. He filled a casual vacancy caused by the resignation of Senator David Feeney, but was defeated at the 2013 federal election, and left parliament at the conclusion of his term. He was the first Turkish-born member of the Australian parliament.

Tillem died on 9 November 2019 from cardiac arrest.  He was 45.

References

1974 births
2019 deaths
Members of the Australian Senate
Members of the Australian Senate for Victoria
Australian Labor Party members of the Parliament of Australia
Turkish emigrants to Australia
Australian people of Turkish descent
Australian Muslims
RMIT University alumni
21st-century Australian politicians